Israel participated in the Junior Eurovision Song Contest 2012 which took place on 1 December 2012, in Amsterdam, The Netherlands, and thus, made its debut at the Junior Eurovision Song Contest. The Israeli broadcaster Israel Broadcasting Authority (IBA) was responsible for organising their entry for the contest, and they chose the kids band Kids.il performing the song "Let The Music Win" to represent Israel in its first competition.

Artist and song information

Kids.il
Kids.il is an Israeli music group consisting of six child singers. Their song entry, "Let The Music Win" was Israel's first entry in the whole competition. It is composed and written by Ohad Hitman. It was the sixth song in the night of the competition, following Russia and preceding Albania. ending in 8th place with 68 points in a field of 12 competing countries.

Group members are:
 Adi Bity (born )

Let the Music Win

At Junior Eurovision
Kids.il performed sixth in the night of the competition, following Russia and preceding Albania. At the close of the voting it had received 68 points, placing 8th in a field of 12 competing countries.

Voting

Notes

References

Junior Eurovision Song Contest
Israel
Junior 2012